Mentz Church is a historic community church located at Montezuma in Cayuga County, New York. It is a rectangular, gable roofed frame structure built between 1820 and 1830 and enlarged during the 1870s-1880s.  The front facade features a centrally engaged square tower.  Also on the property is the church cemetery with headstones dating from 1813 to the 1940s.  The church ceased being used for services in 1954 and is being restored for community use.

It was listed on the National Register of Historic Places in 2004.

References

Churches on the National Register of Historic Places in New York (state)
Churches completed in 1830
Churches in Cayuga County, New York
1830 establishments in New York (state)
National Register of Historic Places in Cayuga County, New York